Nil by Mouth is the seventh studio album by English band Blancmange, released in 2015. The album is made up of instrumental tracks, including a 2005 re-recording of "Holiday Camp", a Blancmange track from the 1980 EP Irene & Mavis.

Nil by Mouth was originally made available at Blancmange's two concerts at the Red Gallery, London, on 15 and 16 May. The album was later given a full release digitally and on CD in September.

Critical reception

Upon release, Andy Jex of MusicOMH wrote: "Nil by Mouth is a reminder of where Blancmange originally came from; very much born of the DIY improvisation of the kitchen sink recording that typified their earlier years. This is stripped-down, bare bones Blancmange with music evoking films never written, scenes never soundtracked and popcorn never eaten." Caspar Gomez of The Arts Desk stated: "The results are more entertaining and gripping than Blancmange's last "proper" album. It's not essential fare, but it does put a smile on the face." Mark Elliott of Record Collector concluded: "Nil by Mouth offers no suggestion that Blancmange will be heading out on the revival circuit anytime soon."

Track listing

Personnel
 Neil Arthur - instrumentation, mixing, recording
 Stephen Luscombe - instrumentation (track 9)
 Dallas Simpson - mastering

Other
 Adam Yeldham - artwork
 Helen Kincaid - painting
 Steve Malins - management

References

2015 albums
Blancmange (band) albums